Adrian Foster (born January 15, 1982) is a Canadian former professional ice hockey centre. He was drafted in the first round, 28th overall, in the 2001 NHL Entry Draft by the New Jersey Devils.

Playing career
Foster was drafted in the first round, 28th overall, by the New Jersey Devils in the 2001 NHL Entry Draft.

Even though Foster was drafted, he never played in the National Hockey League. He spent his professional career with the Albany River Rats, Lowell Devils, and Houston Aeros of the American Hockey League, EC Red Bull Salzburg of the Austrian Hockey League, Dinamo Riga of the Kontinental Hockey League, and the Frankfurt Lions, Straubing Tigers of the DEL.

During the beginning of the 2011–12 season, Foster returned to North America, signing a contract with the Lake Erie Monsters of the AHL on October 18, 2011. Due to injury, Foster was limited to only 8 games with the Monsters, before returning to Germany at the deadline to play a stint with the Grizzly Adams Wolfsburg for the remainder of the season on February 1, 2012.

Foster remained un-signed into the 2012–13 season, before agreeing to a one-year contract with the Idaho Steelheads on October 17, 2012. He immediately marked his debut in the ECHL, producing 4 assists in a 7-6 shoot-out victory over the Colorado Eagles on the same night.

Career statistics

References

External links
 

1982 births
Living people
Abbotsford Heat players
Albany River Rats players
Brandon Wheat Kings players
Canadian expatriate ice hockey players in Austria
Canadian expatriate ice hockey players in Germany
Canadian expatriate ice hockey players in Latvia
Canadian expatriate ice hockey players in Sweden
Canadian ice hockey centres
Dinamo Riga players
EC Red Bull Salzburg players
Frankfurt Lions players
Grizzlys Wolfsburg players
Houston Aeros (1994–2013) players
Ice hockey people from Alberta
Idaho Steelheads (ECHL) players
Lake Erie Monsters players
Lowell Devils players
National Hockey League first-round draft picks
New Jersey Devils draft picks
Örebro HK players
San Francisco Bulls players
Saskatoon Blades players
Sportspeople from Lethbridge
Straubing Tigers players